Bush Fire is an album by drummer Louis Moholo, saxophonist Evan Parker, pianist Pule Pheto, and bassists Gibo Pheto and Barry Guy. It was recorded during July 1995 at Gateway Studio in London, and was released in 1996 by Ogun Records.

Reception

In a review for AllMusic, Thom Jurek wrote: "Bush Fire is worth raving about for its execution certainly, but more important, it is the defined and near-symbiotic musical relationship between Moholo and Parker... that is perhaps most astonishing... It's a breathtaking ride through the outer edges of free jazz, but it's one so musical, so lyrically brilliant, it could never be repeated. Thank the heavens for this recording."

The authors of The Penguin Guide to Jazz Recordings called the album "hugely impressive and moving," and stated that it "underlines Moholo's extraordinary ability to mix the hottest African grooves with entirely free playing."

Track listing

 "Bush Fire" – 13:24
 "For Chisa" – 7:12
 "South Afrika is Free - Ok?" – 11:48
 "Baobab" – 9:25
 "Mark of Respect" – 4:18
 "Back Beat" – 6:26
 "Sticks" – 4:52
 "Coincidence" – 5:03
 "Flaming July" – 8:15
 "For Mpumi" – 8:03

Personnel 
 Evan Parker – tenor saxophone, soprano saxophone
 Pule Pheto – piano
 Barry Guy – bass, piccolo bass
 Gibo Pheto – bass
 Louis Moholo – drums

References

1996 albums
Louis Moholo albums
Evan Parker albums
Barry Guy albums
Ogun Records albums